The Weston Generating Station, also known as the Weston Power Plant, is a base load, coal fired, electrical power station located in the villages of Rothschild and Kronenwetter in Marathon County, Wisconsin, United States. In 2009, it was listed as the fifth largest generating station in Wisconsin, with a net summer capacity of 1,076 MW.  It is owned by Wisconsin Public Service, a subsidiary of WEC Energy Group.

This plant is connected to the power grid via numerous 115 kV and 345 kV lines. In February 2008 the Arrowhead-Weston 345,000 volt transmission line was completed allowing more power to be transmitted between Duluth, Minnesota, The Stone Lake Substation, and the Weston plant. Unit 1 was retired in 2015, while Unit 2 was switched to natural gas.

Between November 2016 and April 2020, the plant consumed on average 196,670 tons of coal per month, or approximately 6,500 tons daily.

Units

Electricity Production 
In 2021, Columbia Energy Center generated 4,767 GWh, approximately 7.6% of the total electric power generated in Wisconsin (62,584 GWh) for that year. The plant had a 2021 annual capacity factor of 50.75%.

Sub-notes:

(1) : Table data reflects electrical generation from all fuels (subbituminous coal, refined coal, distillate fuel oil, and natural gas). Monthly natural gas generation represents on average 1.2% of total generation.

(2) : Major fuel switched from subbituminous coal to refined coal in November 2016

See also

List of power stations in Wisconsin

References

External links
 https://web.archive.org/web/20071028071616/http://www.wisconsinpublicservice.com/news/weston/background.aspx* https://web.archive.org/web/20081022133605/http://www.wisconsinpublicservice.com/news/coal.aspx

Energy infrastructure completed in 1954
Energy infrastructure completed in 1960
Energy infrastructure completed in 1981
Energy infrastructure completed in 2008
Buildings and structures in Marathon County, Wisconsin
Coal-fired power stations in Wisconsin